Dylan Edwards (born 10 January 1996) is an Australian professional rugby league footballer who plays as a  for the Penrith Panthers in the NRL with whom he won the 2021 and 2022 NRL premierships.

Background
Edwards was born in Albury, New South Wales, Australia and moved to Dorrigo, New South Wales at a young age. He was educated at Dorrigo High School.

He played his junior rugby league for the Bellingen Dorrigo Magpies before being signed by the Penrith Panthers in 2012.

Playing career

Early career
Edwards moved to Penrith, New South Wales to play for Penrith's S. G. Ball Cup team in 2013. In 2015 and 2016, he was a member of Penrith's NYC team. On 4 October 2015, he played for the Penrith club in their 2015 NYC Grand Final win over the Manly Warringah Sea Eagles.
Edwards played 44 games, scored 20 tries and kicked 72 goals for 224 points in his U20s career from 2015 to 2016.

2016
On 10 February, he re-signed with the Penrith club on a two-year contract until the end of 2018. On 7 May, he played for the Junior Kangaroos against the Junior Kiwis. As a result of Penrith centre Tyrone Peachey being dropped for disciplinary reasons, Edwards made his NRL debut for the Penrith against the Cronulla-Sutherland Sharks on 10 July. In September, he was named on the interchange bench in the 2016 NYC Team of the Year.

2017
Edwards was named in the Penrith 2017 Auckland Nines squad. He played 14 games for Penrith in the 2017 NRL season and scored two tries for the Penrith club.

2018
In Round 8 of the 2018 NRL season, Edwards suffered a season ending shoulder injury after a tackle in the 13th minute against Canterbury-Bankstown.

2019
In round 17 of the 2019 NRL season, Edwards scored two tries as Penrith defeated the Gold Coast 24–2 at Penrith Stadium.

In round 21 against Cronulla-Sutherland, Edwards scored two tries in a 26–20 victory at Panthers Stadium.

Edwards made a total of 20 appearances for Penrith in the 2019 NRL season as the club finished a disappointing 10th on the table and missed out on the finals for the first time since 2015.

2020
On 20 February it was revealed that Edwards had suffered a syndesmosis tear in his right ankle following a training session.  Edwards later had surgery and was ruled out for an indefinite period. He returned in round 6 against the Melbourne Storm.

Edwards played 14 games for Penrith as the club claimed the Minor Premiership and reached the 2020 NRL Grand Final.  Edwards played at fullback in the grand final which Penrith lost 26-20 to Melbourne.

2021

In round 19 of the 2021 NRL season, Edwards kicked his first field goal against the Brisbane Broncos which was a two point field goal in Penrith's 18-12 victory.

In round 22, Edwards scored two tries in a 34-16 victory over St. George Illawarra.

Edwards played a total of 21 games for Penrith in the 2021 NRL season including the club's 2021 NRL Grand Final victory over South Sydney.

2022
Edwards played 25 games for Penrith in the 2022 NRL season and scored nine tries.  Edwards played in Penrith's 2022 NRL Grand Final victory over Parramatta and was awarded the Clive Churchill Medal as man of the match.

Honours

Individual
  Ben Alexander Rookie of The Year: 2017
 John Farragher Award: 2021
 Penrith Panthers Members Player of The Year: 2022
 Penrith Panthers Merv Cartwright Medal: 2022
 Clive Churchill Medal: 2022

Club
 NRL Premiership: 2021, 2022
 NRL Minor Premiership: 2020, 2022
 NRL Grand Final Runners-up: 2020

References

External links

Penrith Panthers profile
Panthers profile
NRL profile

1996 births
Living people
Australian rugby league players
Penrith Panthers players
Penrith Panthers captains
Junior Kangaroos players
Rugby league fullbacks
Rugby league wingers
Rugby league centres
Rugby league players from Albury, New South Wales